Everett Bradley is an American multi-instrumentalist, singer, songwriter, actor, and playwright. He is currently a touring member of the rock band Bon Jovi.

Biography
 
Born in South Carolina, Bradley attended Indiana University on a vocal scholarship. He first came to the East Coast to play with John Eddie. He has toured as a background vocalist and percussionist with Bruce Springsteen and the E Street Band, Jon Bon Jovi, and Hall & Oates. His theatre credits include being part of the creative team of Swing! (Theatre World Award 2000), being the first American to perform with and direct Stomp, for which he was nominated for a Grammy, and performing in the Cotton Club musical revue After Midnight. He has served as musical director for Carly Simon and NBC's The Meredith Vieira Show, for which he also wrote the show's theme song and other music included in the program. He has recorded with GRP Records' Dee Carstensen, Joey Ramone, Polygram act Jane Williams, Verve's Chris Botti and Cyndi Lauper.

Bradley also performed vocals on the 1995 hit single from the Original, "I Luv U Baby". Starting in 2002, he began putting on his own funk-influenced holiday production, Holidelic, which has seen guests such as Fred Schneider, Vernon Reid, John Forté, Elmo Shropshire and Celeste Holm. He has also worked and performed as a percussionist and backing vocalist with American rock band Bon Jovi in 2003 during This Left Feels Right Live session, and he became the touring percussionist for Bon Jovi in 2016 to support the band's This House Is Not for Sale Tour. In video games, he provided the voice of Paul Chuck in Um Jammer Lammy, as well as his vocals to the songs "Throw It All Away", "Rhythm and Balance", "The Supernatural", "For True Story" and "Supporting Me" for the character Shadow the Hedgehog in Sonic Adventure 2.

References

Living people
African-American male singers
American percussionists
E Street Band members
Hall & Oates members
People from Greenwood, South Carolina
Year of birth missing (living people)
Daryl Hall and the Daryl's House Band members